Active cooling is a heat-reducing mechanism that is typically implemented in electronic devices and indoor buildings to ensure proper heat transfer and circulation from within.

Unlike its counterpart passive cooling, active cooling is entirely dependent on energy consumption in order to operate. It uses various mechanical systems that consume energy to dissipate heat. It is commonly implemented in systems that are unable to maintain their temperature through passive means. Active cooling systems are usually powered through the use of electricity or thermal energy but it's possible for some systems to be powered by solar energy or even hydroelectric energy. They need to be well-maintained and sustainable in order for them to perform its necessary tasks or the possibility of damages within objects could occur. Various applications of commercial active cooling systems include indoor air conditioners, computer fans, and heat pumps.

Building usage 
Many buildings require high demands in cooling and as much as 27 out of 50 largest metropolitan areas around the world are located in areas of hot or tropical weather. With this, engineers have to establish the heat balance in order to ensure proper ventilation throughout the structure.

The heat balance equation is given as:

Using this, it can be determined how much cooling is required within the infrastructure.

There are three active cooling systems commonly used in the residential sectors:

Fans 

A fan is three to four blades rotated by an electrical motor at a constant speed. Throughout the rotation, airflow is produced and having the surrounding being cooled through the process of forced convection heat transfer. Because of its relatively low price, it is the most frequently used out of the three active cooling systems in the residential sector.

Heat pumps 

A heat pump utilizes electricity in order to extract heat from a cool area into a warm area, causing the cool area to lower in temperature and the warm area to increase in temperature.

There are two types of heat pumps:

Compression heat pumps 
Being the more popular variant of the two, compression heat pumps operates through the use of the refrigerant cycle. The vapor refrigerant in the air gets compressed while increasing in temperature, creating a superheated vapor. The vapor then goes through a condenser and converts into a liquid form, dispelling more heat in the process. Traveling through the expansion valve, the liquid refrigerant forms a mixture of liquid and vapor. As it passes through the evaporator, vapor refrigerant forms and expels into the air, repeating the refrigerant cycle.

Absorption heat pumps 
The process for the absorption heat pump works similarly to the compression variant with the main contrast being the usage of an absorber instead of a compressor. The absorber takes in the vapor refrigerant and creates a liquid form which then travels into the liquid pump to be turned into superheated vapor. The absorption heat pump utilizes both electric and heat for its functionality compared to compression heat pumps which only uses electricity.

Evaporative coolers 

An evaporative cooler absorbs the outside air and passes it through water-saturated pads, lowering the temperature of the air through water evaporation.

It can be divided by:

Direct 
This method evaporates the water which would then travel directly into the air stream, producing a small form of humidity. It usually requires a decent amount of water consumption in order to properly lower the temperature of the surrounding area.

Indirect 
This method evaporates the water into a second air stream and then putting it through a heat exchanger, lowering the temperature of the main air stream without adding any humidity. Compared to direct evaporative coolers, it requires much less water consumption to operate and lowering temperature.

Other applications 
Besides normal commercial usage of active cooling, researchers are also looking for ways to improve the implementation of active cooling into various technologies.

Thermoelectric Generator(TEG) 
The thermoelectric generator, or TEG, is a power source that has been recently experimented with to test its viability in maintaining active cooling. It is a device that makes use of the Seebeck effect to convert heat energy into electrical energy. Applications of the power source are more commonly found in technologies requiring high power. Examples include space probes, aircraft, and automobiles.

In a 2019 research, the viability of TEG active cooling was tested. The test was applied on a Raspberry PI3, a small single-board computer, equipped with a fan powered by TEG and was compared alongside another powered by a commercial passive cooler. Throughout the research, the voltage, the power, and the temperature in both of the Raspberry PIs were observed and recorded. The data showed that throughout the benchmark test, the TEG- powered Raspberry PI3 stabilized to a temperature a few Celsius lower than the passive cooling Raspberry PI3. The power produced by the TEG was also analyzed to measure the possibility of the fan having self-sustainable capabilities. Currently, using only TEG to power the fan isn't enough to be completely self-sustainable because it lacks enough energy for the initial startup of the fan. But, with the implementation of an energy accumulator, it would be possible.

The power generation of TEG is given as:

Based on the result, the thermoelectric generator active cooling has been shown to effectively decrease and maintain temperatures that is comparable to commercial usage of passive coolers.

Near Immersion Active Cooling (NIAC) 

Near Immersion Active Cooling, or NIAC, is a thermal management technique that has been recently researched in an effort to reduce the amount of heat accumulation generated by Wire + Arc Additive Manufacturing, or WAAM (a metal 3-D printing technology). NIAC utilizes a cooling liquid that surrounds the WAAM within a work tank and increases the water level when metal is being deposited. The direct contact with the liquid allows for quick withdrawal of heat from the WAAM, decreasing temperature by a significant amount.

In a 2020 experiment, researchers wanted to discover the feasibility of using the NIAC and to test its cooling capabilities. The experiment compared the effectiveness of mitigating temperature generated by the WAAM between natural cooling, passive cooling, and near immersion active cooling. Natural cooling used air, passive cooling used a cooling liquid that stays on a fixed level, and NIAC used a cooling liquid that rises based on the actions of the WAAM.

The following tests were used to measure the feasibility of using NIAC:
 Thermal analysis: In the thermal analysis, there was a significant disparity of heat between NIAC and the other cooling types, with NIAC cooling the technology at a much faster rate.
 Geometric quality: For the geometric quality of the walls, NIAC had the slimmest and tallest wall which shows tough durability of the WAAM when using active cooling.
 Porosity assessment: The porosity assessment showed that active cooling contained the lowest porosity level. A high porosity level has adverse effects on mechanical properties, such as limited ductility.
 Mechanical properties: NIAC tends to equalize the mechanical properties, especially ductility, in contrast to both natural and passive cooling.

They concluded NIAC is viable and comparable to conventional cooling methods such as passive and natural cooling.

Comparison with passive cooling 
Active cooling is usually compared alongside passive cooling in various situations to determine which provides a better and more efficient way of cooling. Both of these are viable in many situations but depending on several factors, one could be more advantageous than the other.

Advantages 
Active cooling systems are usually better in terms of decreasing temperature than passive cooling systems. Passive cooling doesn't utilize much energy for its operation but instead takes advantage of natural cooling, which takes longer to cool over a long period of time. Most people prefer the use of active cooling systems in hot or tropical climates than passive cooling because of its effectiveness in lowering temperature in a short time interval. In technologies, it helps maintain proper thermal conditions, preventing the risk of damages or overheating of the core operation systems. It is able to better balance out the heat generation from the technology, maintaining it in a consistent manner. Some active cooling systems also contain the possibility of being self-sustainable as shown in the application of the thermoelectric generator compared to passive cooling where it is highly dependent on natural means to operate.

Disadvantages 
The issues with active cooling compared to passive cooling are mainly the financial costs and energy consumption. Because of active cooling's high energy requirement, it makes it much less energy efficient as well as less cost efficient. In a residential setting, active cooling usually consumes a large amount of energy in order to provide enough cooling throughout the entire building which increases the financial costs. Engineers of the building would need to take in account that an increase in energy consumption would also play a factor in negatively affecting the global climate. Compared to active cooling, passive cooling are more seen being used in places with average or low temperatures.

See also
 Cooling
Passive cooling
Passive daytime radiative cooling

References 

Cooling technology